Sylvester of the River Obnora (died 25 April 1479), also known as Sylvester of Obnorsk, was a Russian Orthodox hermit who is recognized as a saint. Sylvester was inspired by the teachings of Sergius of Radonez. He was trained at Trinity Monastery. Sylvester then went as a hermit to live along the banks of the River Obnora, living on either herbs or tree bark and roots.  He nearly died but is said to have received sustenance from an angel that saved him. Later others joined him and he established a monastery.

Sources
Walsh, Michael. A New Dictionary of Saints. (Liturgical Press, 2007) p. 567
article from a website about Saints

1479 deaths
Russian saints of the Eastern Orthodox Church
Year of birth unknown
Angelic visionaries